Golestan (also Romanized as Golestān) is a village in Hoseynabad Rural District, in the Central District of Anar County, Kerman Province, Iran. As per the 2006 census, its population was 320, with 88 families.

References 

Populated places in Anar County